Deputado Joaquim d'Abreu Coelho Airport  is the airport serving Arraias, Brazil.

History
The airport was commissioned on August 5, 2013.

Airlines and destinations
No scheduled flights operate at this airport.

Access

See also

List of airports in Brazil

References

External links

Airports in Tocantins